Thainetes is a monotypic genus of Southeast Asian sheet weavers containing the single species, Thainetes tristis. It was first described by Alfred Frank Millidge in 1995, and has only been found in Thailand.

See also
 List of Linyphiidae species (Q–Z)

References

Linyphiidae
Monotypic Araneomorphae genera
Spiders of Asia